Ričardas Kuncaitis (born 28 June 1993) is a Lithuanian boxer. He represented Lithuania at 2010 Summer Youth Olympics and won a gold medal.

In 2011 for the first time Kuncaitis represented Lithuania in World Championships and lost in first round. In 2013 Kuncaitis participated in Summer Universiade, but lost in first round.

Achievements

References 

1993 births
Living people
Boxers at the 2010 Summer Youth Olympics
Lithuanian male boxers
Welterweight boxers
Youth Olympic gold medalists for Lithuania